Humberto Alfonso Monserrate Anselmi (1917–1989) was an American agronomist engineer of Puerto Rican descent.

Anselmi was a founding member and former president of the Instituto De Evaluadores de Puerto Rico from 1964 to 1965.

Anselmi was the son of Manuel Martín Monserrate Febo  and María Anselmi Rodríguez, his brother was Adolfo L. Monserrate Anselmi By 1949 he was Chief of the Office Public Works Progress Office of Puerto Rico. He was nominated president of the Phi Sigma Alpha fraternity on four occasions.

He died on May 2, 1989 at age 71 and was buried at Buxeda Memorial Park in San Juan, Puerto Rico.

See also

List of Puerto Ricans

References

20th-century births
1989 deaths
People from Santa Isabel, Puerto Rico
American agronomists